P.A.R.T.S. - Performing Arts Research and Training Studios is an international school for contemporary dance that is located in Vorst, one of the 19 municipalities located in the Brussels-Capital Region of Belgium.

History 
P.A.R.T.S School for Contemporary Dance  was founded in 1995 by the Belgian choreographer Anne Teresa De Keersmaeker and Bernard Foccroulle, then director of the national opera De Munt. They initiated P.A.R.T.S. to fill the gap in professional training for contemporary dance. Their intention was to provide a pedagogical anchor for contemporary dance in Belgium, which had started in the early 1980s and had seen a quick and strong development since then. At that time, there were only a few institutions in Europe that resolutely focused on these new artistic developments.

"At that time, contemporary Belgian dance was already internationally well-respected. But there was no longer a school to pass along that experience. That's why De Keersmaeker decided to set up P.A.R.T.S.”, said deputy director Theo Van Rompay in an interview in 2012. In 1988, Maurice Béjart's dance school Mudra in Brussels had closed. In 1992, Anne Teresa De Keersmaeker became the choreographer-in-residence at the national opera De Munt and one of her ambitions was to answer the lack of educational possibilities for contemporary dance. Prior to the start of P.A.R.T.S. in 1995, Rosas, the dance company of Anne Teresa De Keersmaeker, and De Munt had already been organizing a dance course for students from different countries for a couple of years. With P.A.R.T.S., they wanted to give that dance education a permanent character.

Anne Teresa de Keersmaeker expressed the philosophy, ambition and spirit of P.A.R.T.S. as follows: “I cannot teach anyone to dance. One learns to dance oneself. But perhaps I can give them a desire, an experience, create a space for challenges.”

The first generation of P.A.R.T.S. students graduated in 1998, a group of dancers and choreographers who immediately found work in the main dance companies or attracted public and critical attention with their own creations.

When P.A.R.T.S. marked its 20th anniversary in 2015, the school announced that approximately 860 students, teachers and staff had been involved with the school since its start in 1995. P.A.R.T.S. and HES-SO/Manufacture, the High School of Performing Arts that is part of the University of Applied Sciences and Arts Western Switzerland (Lausanne), are 2013-2017 partner institutions for higher education in contemporary dance.

Pedagogical curriculum
Anne Teresa De Keersmaeker was inspired by Mudra, where she had been a student herself, and which had moved with Béjart to Switzerland. "Mudra was accommodated in an enormous hangar where also the Ballet of the 20th Century (Note: the company of choreographer Maurice Béjart) rehearsed. The idea of the choreographer was to train dancers who would have a look at other disciplines. Among the teachers, there were great people like Fernand Schirren (rhythm and percussion) and Alfons Goris (theatre acting). It was a gathering place for young people from all over the world, a meeting place for different generations of dancers and choreographers. There was both rigor and anarchy. It was a crucial place for me." As Mudra shared its housing with the Ballet of the 20th century, today P.A.R.T.S. shares its accommodation with Rosas and Ictus, the contemporary music ensemble. Mudra teacher Fernand Schirren even became one of the teachers at P.A.R.T.S.. And like Mudra, P.A.R.T.S. has become a meeting place for different generations of dancers and choreographers from all over the world.

Anne Teresa De Keersmaeker designed the pedagogical curriculum of P.A.R.T.S.. Originally, the program lasted three years. This changed in 2000, when some changes were made and the program was extended, with the option to specialize as a dancer or as a choreographer. The pedagogical curriculum currently consists of two independent parts (called cycles). The first part is the Training Cycle which lasts three years and forms the basis of the course. The second part is the subsequent Research Studios, which lasts two years.

During the program, much attention is paid to the repertoire of Rosas, the dance company of Anne Teresa De Keersmaeker. Each year students learn one complete Rosas choreography. In addition, the repertoire of other contemporary choreographers is addressed, such as Pina Bausch, William Forsythe and Trisha Brown.

International renown
P.A.R.T.S. has achieved international renown with its students and teachers from more than twenty countries, mainly Europe and the United States.

However, at its founding in 1995, the influential French critic Jean-Marc Adolphe claimed that the idea for the school was not good and that it would only be a training college for Rosas. Six years later, he revised his opinion. Together with Alain Crombecque, director of the Festival d’Automne, he invited the school for a one-month stay at the Théâtre de la Bastille and the Théâtre du Rond-Point in Paris. According to Alain Crombecque they considered the activity carried out by P.A.R.T.S. since 1995 in Brussels as exemplary, and they considered it important to testify about it in France. This initiative was repeated during the 2010 edition of the Festival d’Automne.

The P.A.R.T.S. students regularly present their work to the audience. They do not only do this at the P.A.R.T.S. studios in Brussels, but also at wide range of theatres and art centres in Belgium and abroad (amongst others at the Kaaitheater in Brussels, Vooruit and CAMPO in Ghent, DE Studio and Monty in Antwerp, STUK in Leuven, De Brakke Grond in Amsterdam, PACT Zollverein in Essen, Plac Wolnosci/ Malta Festival in Poznan and Mimar Sinan University Bomonti Campus in Istanbul).

In 2010, P.A.R.T.S. received the Silver Lion for Dance at the 7th International Festival of Contemporary Dance of the Venice Biennale. The jury awarded P.A.R.T.S. the prize for its study program. The motivation of the Silver Lion award reads as follows: “Instituted rather recently (1995), the P.A.R.T.S acquired immediate recognition throughout Europe as a center of pedagogical innovation, with a complete and intensive program of studies in which the most advanced techniques of contemporary dance dialogue with other artistic disciplines, in particular with theatre and music. A laboratory of movement which focuses not only on the development of the dancer’s skills, but on his search for artistic identity as well.”

Some renowned alumni
Some well-known alumni who graduated from P.A.R.T.S., are:
 Heine Avdal
 Eleanor Bauer
 Sidi Larbi Cherkaoui
 Mette Ingvartsen
 Salva Sanchis
 Ula Sickle
 Andros Zins-Browne

Financial support
Since 1998, P.A.R.T.S. receives grants from the Ministry of Education of the Flemish Community of Belgium. From 2002, this is arranged through contractual agreements that are renewed five-yearly. The school currently receives additional funding from the netwerk [DNA] Departures and Arrivals, that is co-financed by the European Commission (Creative Europe Program). Between 2001 and 2014 the school received additional funding from the DÉPARTS, that was also co-financed by the European Commission.

Book publications about P.A.R.T.S.
 Steven de Belder (ed.), Theo van Rompay (ed.), Documenting 10 years of contemporary dance education, P.A.R.T.S., 2006, 211 p.
This book was conceived on the occasion of the 10th anniversary of P.A.R.T.S..
 Theo van Rompay (ed.), 20 years - 50 portraits, P.A.R.T.S., 2016, 408 p., 
This book was conceived on the occasion of the 20th anniversary of P.A.R.T.S.. It comprises portraits of 50 P.A.R.T.S. students and an overview of the 860 students, teachers and staff who together have built out the school.

References

Sources
 Kunstenpunt - Organisations - P.A.R.T.S. according to the Flemish Arts Institute

Further reading
 Joris Janssens, Theo Van Rompay over de impact van 10 jaar P.A.R.T.S., in: Courant, VTi / Vlaams Theater Instituut, May – July 2006, Issue 77, p. 23-28

Dance schools in Belgium